The Islek (Aquilania) is a part of the German Eifel region (Rhineland-Palatinate), in the Bitburg-Prüm district next to the Luxembourg and Belgian border.

In Luxembourg the area extends further known as Éislèck or Ösling-Gau, in Belgium locals call it Aquilaine (then reaching up to Aachen) or even Schneifel.

The Islek or Aquilaine region is known for its dark pine woods, said to house the notorious Macralles (witches), wonderful rivers like the Our and the Sûre (Sauer), and numerous gastronomic delicatessen like Bitburger Beer, Gerolsteiner mineral water, Spelz pastries and freshly fished trout.

Its history dates back to the Roman period when the Aquilanium was part of Belgica prima, the home of the Celtic Trevirii. 
In the 20th Century the region would broadcast to the world from radio stations like Radio Luxembourg, AQLN Radio, Radioropa and Starsat. 

Today the region houses numerous wind energy projects and is a tourist area with ancient cities like Clervaux, Prüm, Burg-Reuland and Vianden. 

The region can be accessed by car from the UK  via the E40 from Calais, Zeebrugge or Oostende to Liège and then the E25 to Bastogne (exit Gouvy) or the E42 to Trier (Trèves) (exits Sankt-Vith, Reuland/Luxembourg, Winterspelt or Prüm)

Great discoveries are the picturesque little town of Ouren, and the 'High Moors' (Hohes Venn - Hautes Fagnes) north of the Islek.

Sources
Winkler Prins

External links
http://www.eifel.de
http://www.islek.de
http://www.eastbelgium.be
http://www.cornelyshof.lu

Regions of the Eifel
Ardennes
Landscapes of Rhineland-Palatinate
Regions of Luxembourg
Regions of Wallonia
Areas of Belgium
German-speaking Community of Belgium
Geography of Liège Province
de:Islek